The 1996–97 USC Trojans men's basketball team represented the University of Southern California during the 1996–97 NCAA Division I men's basketball season. Led by head coach Henry Bibby, they played their home games at the L. A. Sports Arena in Los Angeles, California as members of the Pac-10 Conference. The Trojans finished the season with a record of 17–11 (12–6 Pac-10) and received an at-large bid to the NCAA tournament.

Roster

Schedule and results

|-
!colspan=9 style=| Regular season

|-
!colspan=9 style=| NCAA Tournament

Rankings

Team Players in the 1997 NBA draft

References

Usc Trojans
USC Trojans men's basketball seasons
USC
USC Trojans
USC Trojans